, referred to as Kashima-Soccer Stadium Station by JR East, is a joint-use junction passenger railway station in the city of Kashima, Ibaraki Prefecture, Japan, operated by the East Japan Railway Company (JR East) and the third sector Kashima Rinkai Railway. The station premises are managed by JR East. The station is open to passengers only when there is a football match at the nearby Kashima Soccer Stadium. The station is also a freight depot for the freight-only Kashima Rinkō Line to the  Okunoyahama Freight Terminal.

Lines
Kashima Soccer Stadium Station is served by the Kashima Line, and is located 17.4 km from the official starting point of the line at Katori Station. It is 53.0 kilometers from the terminus of the Ōarai Kashima Line at Mito Station.

Layout
The station consists of one island platform connected to the station building by a footbridge, serving two tracks as well as separate tracks for freight trains. The station is staffed.

Platforms

History
The station opened on November 12, 1970, as a freight terminal named . It formed the boundary between Japanese National Railways (Kashima Line) and Kashima Rinkai Railway (Kashima Rinkō Line).

Although the Kashima Rinkō Line provided passenger services between July 25, 1978, and December 1, 1983, and the Ōarai Kashima Line opened on March 14, 1985, for both freight and passenger traffic, Kita-Kashima Station was not used by passenger services. The station was absorbed into the JR East network upon the privatization of the Japanese National Railways (JNR) on 1 April 1987.

On March 12, 1994, the station was renamed to its present name and passenger services began on a limited basis (only on days when there is a game at Kashima Soccer Stadium).

Passenger statistics
In fiscal 2019, the JR station was used by an average of 411 passengers daily (boarding passengers only).

Surrounding area
Kashima Soccer Stadium

See also
 List of railway stations in Japan

References

External links

 JR East Station Information 
  Kashima Rinkai Testudo Station Information 

Railway stations in Ibaraki Prefecture
Kashima Line
Railway stations in Japan opened in 1970
Kashima, Ibaraki